Saul is the surname of:

 Andrew Saul (born 1946), chairman of the Federal Retirement Thrift Investment Board
 April Saul (born 1955), American Pulitzer Prize-winning journalist
 Bernard Francis Saul (1872-1931), American banker
 Berrick Saul, CBE (1924-2016), Vice-Chancellor of the University of York
 Bernard Saul II, American businessman
 Bill Saul (1940-2006), American National Football League player
 Frank Saul (basketball) (1924-2019), American former National Basketball Association player
 Frank Saul (footballer) (born 1943), English former footballer
 Jack Saul, South African-Israeli tennis player
 John Saul (disambiguation)
 John Hennessy Saul (1819–1897), Irish-born American horticulturist and landscape architect
 Nigel Saul (born 1952), British historian
 Oscar Saul (1912-1994), American screenwriter
 Peter Saul (born 1934), American painter
 Rich Saul (1948-2012), American National Football League player, twin brother of Ron 
 Richard Saul (1891-1965), Irish air marshal
 Roger Saul (born 1950), British businessman, the founder of the Mulberry (company) fashion chain
 Ron Saul (1948–2021), American National Football League player, twin brother of Rich 
 Terry Saul (1921–1976), Choctaw/Chickasaw illustrator, painter, muralist, commercial artist, and educator.